St. Marys is one of the eight townships located in Perry County, Missouri, in the United States of America.

Name
Saint Mary's Township was most likely given the name by Catholic members of the community who worshiped at St. Mary's-of-the-Barrens Church. The name St. Mary's may be further connected to Catholic Kentucky settlers who originated in St. Mary's County, Maryland.

History
St. Mary's Township lies in the southwestern part of Ste Genevieve  County, and was organized between 1850 and 1860.

Geography
St. Mary's is situated in the southwestern corner of Perry County. There are three unincorporated communities in St. Mary's Township: Barks, Silver Lake and Yount.

Demographics

2000 census
As of the census of 2000, there were 1,681 people living in the township. The racial makeup of the town was 98.6% White, 0.4% American Indian and Alaska Native, and 0.5% from other races.

2010 census
As of the census of 2010, there were 1,708 people, with a density of 16.7 per square mile (6.5 km2), residing in the township. The population density was 25 people per square mile.  The racial makeup of the town was 98.24% White, 0.53% American Indian and Alaska Native, and 0.88% from other races.

References

Townships in Perry County, Missouri